Line 9 of Xi'an Metro is a metro line in Xi'an, Shaanxi, China, which opened in 2020.

Stations

References 

09
Railway lines opened in 2020
2020 establishments in China